Eau Pleine is a town in Marathon County, Wisconsin, United States. It is part of the Wausau, WI Metropolitan Statistical Area. The population was 773 at the 2010 census. The unincorporated communities of Little Rose, March Rapids, and Weber are located in the town. The ghost town of Staadts was also located in the town.

History
Eau Pleine is derived from the French phrase meaning "full water" or "stock river".

Geography

Demographics
As of the census of 2000, there were 750 people, 275 households, and 221 families residing in the town. The population density was 22.6 people per square mile (8.7/km2). There were 278 housing units at an average density of 8.4 per square mile (3.2/km2). The racial makeup of the town was 99.20% White, 0.27% Asian, 0.13% from other races, and 0.40% from two or more races. Hispanic or Latino of any race were 0.27% of the population.

There were 275 households, out of which 38.2% had children under the age of 18 living with them, 70.2% were married couples living together, 4.0% had a female householder with no husband present, and 19.3% were non-families. 17.8% of all households were made up of individuals, and 7.6% had someone living alone who was 65 years of age or older. The average household size was 2.73 and the average family size was 3.07.

The population was 27.6% under the age of 18, 6.4% from 18 to 24, 31.3% from 25 to 44, 21.9% from 45 to 64, and 12.8% who were 65 years of age or older. The median age was 36 years. For every 100 females, there were 106.0 males. For every 100 females age 18 and over, there were 107.3 males.

The median income for a household in the town was $41,875, and the median income for a family was $44,861. Males had a median income of $30,735 versus $21,389 for females. The per capita income for the town was $18,052. About 4.2% of families and 4.9% of the population were below the poverty line, including 6.4% of those under age 18 and 10.1% of those age 65 or over.

References

Towns in Marathon County, Wisconsin
Towns in Wisconsin